The GE U18B diesel-electric locomotive was introduced by GE Transportation as a branch line road-switcher in 1973. It was the only North American locomotive powered by the 8-cylinder 7FDL engine. The U18B was not a popular seller with GE only making about 150 of them, and they were mostly purchased by Maine Central and Seaboard Coast Line. Railroads lost interest in specialized road units entering the 1970s. The U18Bs were noted for having reliability issues and being underpowered. The Maine Central referred to their U18Bs as the independence class and named their units after revolutionary war heroes. GE included information about a B18-7 locomotive (which would have followed the U18B) in its 1978 "Series-7 Road Locomotives" service manual, but none of these updated units were ordered, sold, or built.

Original Owners

See also 
 Maine Central
 Seaboard Coast Line

References 

U18B
B-B locomotives
Diesel-electric locomotives of the United States
Railway locomotives introduced in 1973
Freight locomotives
Standard gauge locomotives of the United States
Standard gauge locomotives of Mexico